Upper Twin Island is a bar island in Ohio County, West Virginia on the Ohio River. It lies upstream from its twin, Lower Twin Island. Both islands are part of the city of Wheeling and situated between Martins Ferry, Ohio and mainland Wheeling.

See also 
List of islands of West Virginia

References 
River islands of West Virginia
Landforms of Ohio County, West Virginia
Islands of the Ohio River